 

Hark is a 1985 album by clarinetist Buddy DeFranco, featuring the pianist Oscar Peterson.

Track listing
 "All Too Soon" (Duke Ellington, Carl Sigman) – 7:05
 "Summer Me, Winter Me" (Alan Bergman, Marilyn Bergman, Michel Legrand) – 5:03
 "Llovisna (Light Rain)" (Buddy DeFranco) – 11:13
 "By Myself" (Howard Dietz, Arthur Schwartz) – 5:15
 "Joy Spring" (Clifford Brown) – 5:26
 "This Is All I Ask" (Gordon Jenkins) – 5:09
 "Hark" (DeFranco) – 6:33
 "Why Am I" (Jim Gillis) – 4:19

Personnel

Performance
 Buddy DeFranco – clarinet
 Oscar Peterson – piano
 Joe Pass – guitar
 Niels-Henning Ørsted Pedersen – double bass
 Martin Drew – drums

References

1985 albums
Buddy DeFranco albums
Oscar Peterson albums
Albums produced by Norman Granz
Pablo Records albums